Tauriac may refer to the following places in France:

 Tauriac, Gironde, a commune in the Gironde department
 Tauriac, Lot, a commune in the Lot department
 Tauriac, Tarn, a commune in the Tarn department